Sharon Township, Iowa may refer to:

 Sharon Township, Appanoose County, Iowa
 Sharon Township, Audubon County, Iowa
 Sharon Township, Clinton County, Iowa
 Sharon Township, Johnson County, Iowa